Doveton, Victoria is a suburb in Melbourne, Australia. Doveton may also refer to:

People
 Diana Doveton (1910–1987), English badminton player
 John Doveton (1768–1847), British military officer
 Doveton Sturdee (1859–1925), British naval officer

Places
 Doveton, Chennai, a neighbourhood in Chennai, India
 Electoral district of Doveton, a former district of the Victorian Legislative Assembly